The Church of the Apostles is an American evangelical church located in the Buckhead neighborhood of Atlanta, Georgia. The church was founded in 1987 by Michael Youssef, who left Egypt to attend college in Australia and later immigrated to the United States in 1977.

History
The church was started by Youssef and 28 people who held a meeting in a local school in 1987. Before its expansion in the late 1990s, the church had 1,150 members and a capacity to seat 1,500. In 2006 at least 3,000 people attended services in the $70 million brick building, then recently completed.

Facility
The prominent Neo-Gothic building is visible from Interstate 75, just south of the Mt. Paran Road exit. The west stained-glass windows depict the Apostles, and the stairwell and perimeter stained-glass windows depict the life of Jesus. The rose window is also notable. In addition to the main sanctuary, the facility also includes a 450-seat chapel, fellowship hall, classrooms, administrative space and a parking garage. The site (just south of Nancy Creek) was the location of the old Allstate Insurance office building.

Ministries 
The church currently offers, or has recently offered, the following ministries to its congregation and attendees (some are external programs hosted by the church):
 Family Ministry
 Children's Ministry
 Young Families: 20s & 30s, Genuine Wisdom (for single or married women in their 20s and 30s), MAN UP (for single or married men in their 20s and 30s.)
 Student Ministry or "STS" (Student to Student) for 5th - 12th-grade students
 Apostles College Fellowship
 Sunday Morning Classes
 Small Groups: Small Groups usually meet in homes every week or every other week.  Some groups also meet at the church.
 Women's Ministry
 Men's Ministry: Men's Fraternity, Men's Small Groups, PATH (one-on-one mentoring), Radical Mentoring, Next Generation Fraternity (Men 25-40)
 Congregational Care: CrossCurrent, DivorceCare, Financial Peace University, GriefShare, Living Waters, OnPath, Stephen Ministry

External links
The Church of the Apostles official website

References

Evangelical megachurches in the United States
Megachurches in Georgia
Churches in Atlanta
Christian organizations established in 1987
Evangelical churches in Georgia (U.S. state)